The 1991 Notre Dame Fighting Irish football team represented the University of Notre Dame in the 1991 NCAA Division I-A football season. The team was led by sixth-year head coach Lou Holtz and played its home games on campus at Notre Dame Stadium in South Bend, Indiana.

On September 7, 1991, NBC started televising Notre Dame's home games; it became the first Division I-A football program to have all of its home games televised exclusively by one television network.

Schedule

Roster

Season summary

Indiana

Jerome Bettis 11 Rush, 111 Yds

at Michigan

Michigan State

at Purdue

at Stanford

Pittsburgh

at Air Force

USC

Navy

Tennessee

at Penn State

at Hawaii

vs. Florida (Sugar Bowl)

References

Notre Dame
Sugar Bowl champion seasons
Notre Dame Fighting Irish football seasons
Notre Dame Fighting Irish football